Beals v Saldanha, [2003] 3 S.C.R. 416, 2003 SCC 72 is a leading Supreme Court of Canada decision on the conflict of laws, where the Court established the requirements to enforce foreign judgments in Canada. The Court held that foreign judgments were enforceable in Canada where there was a "real and substantial connection" between the foreign jurisdiction and the subject matter giving rise to the claim.

Background
Geoffrey and Leueen Saldanha and Dominic Thivy were residents of Ontario and sold lots they owned in Florida to Frederick and Patricia Beals. Beals brought an action against Saldanha and Thivy when it was discovered that the defendants did not actually own the property they sold. A defence was filed with the Court but did nothing afterwards and defaulted. A jury awarded Beals $260,000 in damages.

Thivy and Saldanha were informed by a lawyer in Ontario that the judgment could not be enforced and so they did nothing.

Soon Beals brought an action in Ontario to enforce the judgment, which had grown to $800,000 with interest.

At trial the judgment was denied on the basis that the damages had been improperly assessed. On Appeal the Court allowed the foreign judgment.

The issue before the Supreme Court was whether a judgment issued by a Court in Florida could be enforced in Ontario, and whether the defendant could seek refuge under section 7 of the Charter.

Reasons of the court
In a six to three decision, the Court found that the judgment was enforceable. The Court applied the "real and substantial connection" test from the earlier decision of Morguard v. De Savoye to the international context. The test requires the Court to consider whether the subject-matter of the suit or the person involved had a "real and substantial" connection with the country. The Court noted, however, that judgments with sufficient connection will not be enforced if they are contrary to Canadian public policy, contrary to natural justice, or obtained through fraud.

Dissent
Justice LeBel, in dissent, argued for a strengthening of the available defences. He noted that the result in this case was overly harsh and unfair by imposing an 800,000 judgment on an 8,000 property due to essentially bad luck. He proposed that the real and substantial connection test be modified in the international context to reflect the added hardships imposed on litigating in a foreign country.

In his view, the defences of fraud and natural justice should be broadened in international matters and an additional residual category should be allowed for injustices that do not easily fit into the main categories using what lower court called a "judicial sniff test".

LeBel pointed to a number of examples such as the Hague Conference on foreign judgments had proposed to grant domestic judges to lower foreign punitive damages. and the Loewen case, where a Mississippi jury awarded 500 million in damages against a BC company for anti-competitive practices.

References

External links
 

Conflict of laws case law
Canadian civil procedure case law
Supreme Court of Canada cases
2003 in Canadian case law